Squeeze Box: The Complete Works of "Weird Al" Yankovic is a 15-album box set by American comedy musician "Weird Al" Yankovic, released on November 24, 2017.

Packaging
The set is housed inside a replica of Yankovic's accordion, whence its name is derived. This "unprecedented" style of packaging caused the entire set to have a rather long lead manufacturing time. Squeeze Box also comes with "a 100-page book including a treasure trove of unseen photos and memorabilia."

Release
A pre-order for the set was released on January 12, 2017 via Pledge Music, almost ten months ahead of its release. This was due to the time it would take for the manufacturer to create the packaging. The box was available in both vinyl and CD formats. The CD version featured the discs themselves housed in custom-fitted pockets in sleeves with standard LP-size jackets. The LP version marked the first time that five of Yankovic's albums (viz. Alapalooza, Bad Hair Day, Running with Scissors, Poodle Hat, and Straight Outta Lynwood) appeared on vinyl. Following the Pledge Music pre-order, only a handful of the sets were manufactured and released.

Contents
Squeeze Box collects all of Yankovic's 14 studio albums, ranging from his 1983 debut "Weird Al" Yankovic, to his 2014 studio release Mandatory Fun. Six of these records (viz. "Weird Al" Yankovic, "Weird Al" Yankovic in 3-D, Dare to Be Stupid, Polka Party!, Even Worse, UHF – Original Motion Picture Soundtrack and Other Stuff) were produced by Rick Derringer.  The remaining albums (viz. Off the Deep End, Alapalooza, Bad Hair Day, Running with Scissors, Poodle Hat, Straight Outta Lynwood, Alpocalypse, and Mandatory Fun) were produced by Yankovic himself. "Weird Al" Yankovic through Bad Hair Day had been released by the now-defunct Scotti Bros. Records, Running with Scissors through Alpocalypse were released by Volcano Entertainment, and Mandatory Fun was released by RCA Records. All three labels are now under the control of Sony Music Entertainment, whose Legacy Recordings unit released the compilation. The songs that are featured in this collection have all been remastered. The fifteenth record, Medium Rarities, is a bonus album composed of new and unreleased content.

"Weird Al" Yankovic (1983)

"Weird Al" Yankovic in 3-D (1984)

Dare to Be Stupid (1985)

Polka Party! (1986)

Even Worse (1988)

UHF – Original Motion Picture Soundtrack and Other Stuff (1989)

Off the Deep End (1992)

Alapalooza (1993)

Bad Hair Day (1996)

Running with Scissors (1999)

Poodle Hat (2003)

Straight Outta Lynwood (2006)

Alpocalypse (2011)

Mandatory Fun (2014)

Medium Rarities (2017)

Medium Rarities is the name of the fifteenth album included in Squeeze Box. This release, exclusive to this box set, is composed entirely of rare and unreleased tracks from Yankovic's career.

"Pac-Man"
One of the first rarities announced for the album was "Pac-Man", a parody of the Beatles' song "Taxman", and based on the arcade game of the same name. The song had been recorded in 1981, and was popular on the Dr. Demento Show. Yankovic, who recorded the song in a friend's garage on a TEAC Cassette Portastudio, sampled sounds from the actual Pac-Man arcade game for use in the song. After the song was played a few times on Dr. Demento's radio program, the host received a cease-and-desist letter that ordered him to stop airing the spoof. In order to get the song on the Medium Rarities album, Yankovic had to get permission from both Bandai Namco Entertainment (the company that owns the rights to Pac-Man) as well as the estate of George Harrison (the writer of "Taxman"). In regards to the former, the company "had a good sense of humor about" the parody. So as to clear the parody with the Harrison estate, Yankovic worked with Dhani Harrison, the son of George Harrison.

Accolades
Squeeze Box won the 2019 Grammy Award for Best Boxed or Special Limited Edition Package.  As one of the box set's art directors, Yankovic received the award along with the other art directors, Meghan Foley and Annie Stoll.

Charts

Notes

References

2017 compilation albums
albums produced by Rick Derringer
Legacy Recordings compilation albums
"Weird Al" Yankovic compilation albums